Daryl Keith Irvine (born November 15, 1964) from Grottoes, Virginia is a former relief pitcher in Major League Baseball who played for the Boston Red Sox (1990–1992). He batted and threw right-handed.

Irvine earned his first major league victory on August 11, 1990. He pitched 2 scoreless innings (13th and 14th) to pick up the victory during a 4-2 Red Sox win over the Mariners. 

In a three-season career, Irvine posted a 4-5 record with 27 strikeouts and a 5.68 ERA in 63-1/3 innings pitched. He now resides in Harrisonburg, Virginia.

References

External links
, or Retrosheet

1964 births
Living people
Baseball players from Virginia
Boston Red Sox players
Buffalo Bisons (minor league) players
Ferrum Panthers baseball players
Greensboro Hornets players
Major League Baseball pitchers
New Britain Red Sox players
Pawtucket Red Sox players
People from Harrisonburg, Virginia
Winter Haven Red Sox players
People from Grottoes, Virginia